

Kora (THL Simplified Phonetic Transcription: kor ra) is a transliteration of a Tibetan word that means "circumambulation" or "revolution". Kora is both a type of pilgrimage and a type of meditative practice in the Tibetan Buddhist or Bon traditions. A Kora is performed by the practitioner making a circumambulation around a sacred site or object, typically as a constituent part of a pilgrimage, ceremony, celebration or ritual. In broader terms, it is a term that is often used to refer to the entire pilgrimage experience in the Tibetan regions.

Classification and foci
For "pilgrimage", Tibetans generally use the term nékor, "circling around an abode" (THL: né), referring to the general practice of circumambulation as a way of relating to such places. In the context of kora, the né or  néchen is rendered as "empowered", "sacred" or "holy" place/object, and the né is credited with the ability to transform those that circumambulate it. Aspects of both the natural and the man-made world are also considered to be the né of a wide variety of nonhuman beings such as iṣṭadevatās or ḍākinīs.

Né generally fall into the following four types:
 Natural sites. The most momentous né are the great sacred mountains and lakes. They cover large areas, sometimes hundreds of square kilometers. Within these areas the points of power may include: peaks, rocks, caves, springs, confluences and sky-burial sites. Kora associated with these natural sites can be arduous treks of long distances, crossing a number of high passes and through difficult terrain.
In the Tibetan region, some traditional kora sites important to the region include: the sacred mountains of Mount Kailash (or Gang Rinpoche or Mt. Tise), Lapchi, Tsari and Kawa Karpo; Lake Manasarovar, Yamdrok and Namtso.

 Man-made sites, including cities, monasteries, temples, stupas, hermitages, etc.

For example, in Nepal, kora are commonly performed around Swayambhunath and Boudhanath, two important stupas in the Kathmandu Valley; in Tibet, around the Potala Palace or the Jokhang in Lhasa.

 Hidden lands (beyul): secret or hidden lands; paradisiacal realms located in the remotest parts of the Himalayas.
 Holy person: a pilgrimage can be made to pay respects to a holy person, the holy person in such instances being considered a né.

The pilgrim is known as a né korwa "one who circles a né", thus defining them by the ritual circumambulation(s) they perform as part of their journey. Pilgrims seek to generate merit (see Merit (Buddhism) by performing koras, which are a major merit generator. The more potent the power place destination the greater the merit. A kora is performed by walking or repeatedly prostrating oneself. Prostration (e.g., versus walking), circumambulating repeatedly or an auspicious number of times all produce greater merit. Kora may also be performed while spinning prayer wheels, chanting mantra, or counting rosary beads. Buddhist pilgrims most typically emulate the path of the sun and circumambulate in a clockwise direction. Bön pilgrims traditionally circumambulate counterclockwise.

Notes

References

External links 
 THL Simplified Phonetic Transcription of Standard Tibetan (thlib.org)
 THL Extended Wylie Transliteration Scheme (thlib.org)

Buddhist pilgrimages
Tibetan Buddhist meditation
Bon